Break-off may refer to:

 Break-off phenomenon, a psychological effect similar to the Overview effect, experienced by astronauts after seeing Earth from space
 Break off or Break shot, the first shot in most types of billiards games